Qezelejah Meydan (also romanized as Qezelejah Meydān and Qezelejeh-ye Meydān) is a village in Shebli Rural District, in the Central District of Bostanabad County, East Azerbaijan Province, Iran. At the 2006 census, its population was 1,054, in 279 families.

References 

Populated places in Bostanabad County